Sau Ung Loo Chan (1906–2002) was Hawaii's first female lawyer of Asian descent.

Chan, the youngest child of her family, was born on August 8, 1906, in Honolulu, Hawaii, to Joe and Choy Shee Loo. Her father was a Chinese immigrant and had a close friendship with Sun Yat-sen. Chan completed her higher education at Punahou School and Yale Law School respectively before settling in Hong Kong with her husband Hin Cheung Chan to raise a family.

In 1941, she returned to Hawaii where she was admitted as the first Asian female to practice law. From 1943-1976, Chan organized and oversaw the Circuit Court Small Estate and Guardianship Division. In 1948, Chan testified before the United States Congress in an effort to have certain portions of the Immigration Act of 1924 amended. She practiced as an estate and guardianship attorney.

Chan died on March 1, 2002, in Kaneohe, Hawaii.

See also 

 List of first women lawyers and judges in Hawaii

References 

Hawaii lawyers
American jurists of Chinese descent
Punahou School alumni
Yale Law School alumni
1906 births
2002 deaths
20th-century American women lawyers
20th-century American lawyers